Frederick Augustus Pike (December 9, 1816 – December 2, 1886) was a U.S. Representative from Maine.

Biography
Born in Calais, Massachusetts (now in Maine), Pike attended the common schools and the Washington Academy, East Machias, Maine.
He was graduated from Bowdoin College, Brunswick, Maine, in 1837.
He studied law.
He was admitted to the bar and commenced practice in Calais, Washington County, Maine in 1840. In 1846 he married future American author Mary Hayden Green, daughter of Elijah Dix Green and Hannah Caflin Hayden. 
He served as mayor of Calais in 1852 and 1853.
He served as member of the State house of representatives 1858-1860 and served as speaker in 1860.

Pike was elected as a Republican to the Thirty-seventh and to the three succeeding Congresses (March 4, 1861 – March 3, 1869).
He served as chairman of the Committee on Expenditures in the Department of State (Thirty-eighth and Thirty-ninth Congresses), Committee on Naval Affairs (Fortieth Congress).
He was an unsuccessful candidate for renomination in 1868.
He resumed the practice of law.
He was again a member of the State house of representatives in 1870 and 1871.
He was an unsuccessful candidate for election in 1872 to the Forty-third Congress.
He died in Calais, Maine, December 2, 1886.
He was interred in Calais Cemetery.

References

External links

 

1816 births
1886 deaths
Republican Party members of the Maine House of Representatives
Bowdoin College alumni
Politicians from Calais, Maine
Republican Party members of the United States House of Representatives from Maine
19th-century American politicians
Washington Academy alumni